Shashidhar Kote is an Indian singer, musician and actor.

Personal life
Kote was born to Kote Vasanth Kumar and Parvathi Kote, in Kalanja village, Mangalore, Karnataka. He had his master's degree in English literature from Mangalore University. He taught literature in the same university later for three years. Being a singer in the Mysore maharaja's court, he received honors from the king.

He is married to Seetha Kote, and has a son.

Career
Kote's was trained in music by Satyabhame, Gopalkrishna Iyer and Vid. Gurudutt. He sings in Kannada, Telugu, Tamil, Malayalam and Hindi languages. As of 2010, Kote had performed in more than 4,000 concerts.

Geetha Chitra 
Kote organizes an event named ′Geetha Chitra′, where music and painting programs are held. Artist B. K. S. Verma paints the subject of the song Kote sings. The event gained popularity in Bangalore, Chennai and Mumbai.

Selected filmography
 Madhuram Milanam Mounam (2018–19)
 Asthitva (2016)

Television
Kote has been a host in TV reality shows as, Little Star Singer, Sangeetha Lahari, Hadondu Haduvenu and Sangeetha Sambrahma.

Serials
 Triveni Sangama
 Meenakshi Maduve
 Kanaka
 Gejjepooje
 Paaru

References

External links
 Kote Music and Arts Foundation
 On Youtube
 On Facebook
 On Soundcloud
 On Raaga
 On Gaana
 

Living people
Bhajan singers
Male actors in Kannada cinema
Indian male film actors
Indian male playback singers
Kannada playback singers
Tamil playback singers
Telugu playback singers
Malayalam playback singers
Kannada film score composers
Singers from Karnataka
20th-century Indian singers
21st-century Indian singers
Year of birth missing (living people)
20th-century Indian male singers
21st-century Indian male singers